Eucalyptus elliptica, commonly known as Bendemeer white gum, is a species of small to medium-sized tree that is endemic to eastern Australia. It has smooth bark, lance-shaped to curved adult leaves, flower buds in groups of seven, white flowers and cup-shaped or hemispherical fruit.

Description
It has smooth, usually powdery white bark with orange or grey blotches.

Taxonomy and naming
Bendemeer white gum was first formally described in 1934 by William Blakely and Ernest McKie from a specimen collected near Bendemeer. They gave it the name E. mannifera var. elliptica and published the description in Blakely's book A Key to the Eucalypts. In 1990 Lawrie Johnson and Ken Hill raised the variety to species status as E. elliptica. The specific epithet (elliptica) refers to the shape of the fruit as described by Blakely and McKie.

Distribution and habitat
Eucalyptus elliptica grows in grassy woodland between the Barrington Tops area and southeastern Queensland, most often in the Bendemeer and Walcha areas.

References

elliptica
Myrtales of Australia
Flora of New South Wales
Flora of Queensland
Trees of Australia
Plants described in 1934
Taxa named by William Blakely